Red soda may refer to:

Big Red (drink), a red soda
Red Kola, a red colored soda with flavoring from the Kola Nut
Fruti Cola, a red soda from Cawy Bottling Company